Senator Larkin may refer to:

Charles H. Larkin (1810–1894), Wisconsin State Senate
Edward P. Larkin (1915–1986), New York State Senate
William J. Larkin Jr. (1928–2019), New York State Senate

See also
John Davis Larkins Jr. (1909–1990), North Carolina State Senate